Féas (Gascon: Hiars) is a former commune in the Pyrénées-Atlantiques department in south-western France. On 1 January 2017, it was merged into the new commune Ance Féas.

See also
Communes of the Pyrénées-Atlantiques department

References

Former communes of Pyrénées-Atlantiques